James Joseph Vincent Bohan (21 July 1919 – 13 October 1967)  was a former Australian rules footballer who played with Hawthorn in the VFL. He played in the centre or at centre half forward.

Bohan captained Hawthorn in 1944 and 1946 and despite playing with the club for almost a decade, he never once appeared in a finals match. He won Hawthorn's 'Best and Fairest' award in 1943 and 1945. 

In a match against Vehicle Park in Albury in September 1945, Bohun kicked 20 goals.

He then left the club without a clearance in 1947 to join VFA side Camberwell, which was then playing under throw-pass rules, where he went on to play 140 games and won their best and fairest award in 1951, 1952 and 1953.

In 2003 he was named as centreman in Hawthorn's official Team of the Century, and as full back in Camberwell's Team of the Century.

References

External links

1919 births
Australian rules footballers from Melbourne
Hawthorn Football Club players
Peter Crimmins Medal winners
Camberwell Football Club players
Camberwell Football Club coaches
1967 deaths
People from Hawthorn, Victoria